This article shows the qualification phase for the 2017 CEV Champions League. A total of 24 teams will enter qualification round. 12 teams have directly qualified to the League round based on the European Cups’ Ranking List.

Qualification Summary

Participating Teams

 Mladost Marina Kaštela
 Gentofte Volley
 Abiant Lycurgus
 Belogorie Belgorod
 Budvanska Rivijera Budva
 Hypo Tirol Innsbruck
 Tiikerit Kokkola
 Hapoel Mate-Asher Akko
 Sir Safety Perugia
 Crvena Zvezda Beograd
 Selver Tallinn
 KV Besa Pëja
 Volley Amriswil
 Omonoia Nicosia
 Dukla Liberec
 Dobrudja 07 Dobrich
 VfB Friedrichshafen
 PAOK Thessaloniki
 ACH Volley Ljubjana
 Arago de Sete
 Noliko Maaseik
 PGE Skra Bełchatów
 Arkas Izmir
 Stroitel Minsk

First round
No first round matches

Second round
Home-Away matches.16 teams will play in the Second roundWinners will advance to the Third round; losers will compete in 32nd Finals of 2017 CEV Cup
All times are local

|}

First leg

|}

Second leg

|}

Third round
Home-Away matches.
Eight teams have received byes into the Third round.
Winners will qualify to the League round; losers will compete in the 16th Finals of 2017 CEV Cup
All times are local

|}

First leg

|}

Second leg

League round
Drawing of Pool was held on June 9, 2016

References

Qualification
2016 in volleyball